Panorama Ridge is a mountain ridge in the Garibaldi Ranges of the Pacific Ranges in southwestern British Columbia, Canada. It is located on the north side of Garibaldi Lake in Garibaldi Provincial Park.

Panorama Ridge was named around 1912 by William J. Gray, a Canadian geologist from Vancouver who took most of his panoramic photos on the ridge.

Climate

Based on the Köppen climate classification, Panorama Ridge is located in the marine west coast climate zone of western North America. Most weather fronts originate in the Pacific Ocean, and travel east toward the Coast Mountains where they are forced upward by the range (Orographic lift), causing them to drop their moisture in the form of rain or snowfall. As a result, the Coast Mountains experience high precipitation, especially during the winter months in the form of snowfall. Winter temperatures can drop below −20 °C with wind chill factors below −30 °C.

See also
 
 Geography of British Columbia

References

External links

Ridges of British Columbia
Garibaldi Ranges
Two-thousanders of British Columbia
New Westminster Land District